The 1993 Torneo Godó was the forty-first edition of the Torneo Godó and it took place from 5 to 12 April 1993.

Andrés Gómez and Javier Sánchez were the defending champions, but Gómez did not compete this year. Javier Sánchez teamed up with Magnus Gustafsson and lost in the quarterfinals to Sergio Casal and Emilio Sánchez.

Shelby Cannon and Scott Melville won the title by defeating Casal and Emilio Sánchez 7–6, 6–1 in the final.

Seeds
The first four seeds received a bye to the second round.

Draw

Finals

Top half

Bottom half

References

External links
 Official results archive (ATP)
 Official results archive (ITF)

Doubles